The 1940 United States presidential election was the 39th quadrennial presidential election. It was held on Tuesday, November 5, 1940. Incumbent Democratic President Franklin D. Roosevelt defeated Republican businessman Wendell Willkie to be reelected for an unprecedented third term in office. 

The election was contested in the shadow of World War II in Europe, as the United States was emerging from the Great Depression. Roosevelt did not want to campaign for a third term initially, but was driven by worsening conditions in Europe. He and his allies sought to defuse challenges from other party leaders such as James Farley and Vice President John Nance Garner. The 1940 Democratic National Convention re-nominated Roosevelt on the first ballot, while Garner was replaced on the ticket by Secretary of Agriculture Henry A. Wallace. Willkie, a dark horse candidate, defeated conservative Senator Robert A. Taft and prosecutor Thomas E. Dewey on the sixth presidential ballot of the 1940 Republican National Convention.

Roosevelt, acutely aware of strong isolationist and non-interventionist sentiment, promised there would be no involvement in foreign wars if he were re-elected. Willkie, who had not previously run for public office, conducted an energetic campaign, managing to revive Republican strength in areas of the Midwest and Northeast. He criticized perceived incompetence and waste in the New Deal, warned of the dangers of breaking the two-term tradition, and accused Roosevelt of secretly planning to take the country into World War II. However, Willkie's association with big business damaged his cause, as many working class voters blamed corporations and business leaders for the Great Depression.  Roosevelt led in all pre-election polls and won a comfortable victory; his margins, though still significant, were less decisive than they had been in 1932 and 1936.

Nominations

Democratic Party 

Throughout the winter, spring, and summer of 1940, there was much speculation as to whether Roosevelt would break with longstanding tradition and run for an unprecedented third term. The two-term tradition, although not yet enshrined in the Constitution, had been established by George Washington when he refused to run for a third term in 1796; other former presidents, such as Ulysses S. Grant in 1880 and Theodore Roosevelt in 1912 had made serious attempts to run for a third term, but the former failed to be nominated, while the latter, forced to run on a third-party ticket, lost to Woodrow Wilson due to the split in the Republican vote. President Roosevelt refused to give a definitive statement as to his willingness to be a candidate again, and he even indicated to some ambitious Democrats, such as James Farley, that he would not run for a third term and that they could seek the Democratic nomination. However, as Nazi Germany swept through Western Europe and menaced the United Kingdom in the summer of 1940, Roosevelt decided that only he had the necessary experience and skills to see the nation safely through the Nazi threat. He was aided by the party's political bosses, who feared that no Democrat except Roosevelt could defeat the popular Willkie.

At the July 1940 Democratic Convention in Chicago, Roosevelt easily swept aside challenges from Farley and John Nance Garner, his vice-president. Garner was a Texas conservative who had turned against Roosevelt in his second term because of his liberal economic and social policies. As a result, Roosevelt decided to pick a new running mate, Henry A. Wallace from Iowa, his Secretary of Agriculture and an outspoken liberal. That choice was strenuously opposed by many of the party's conservatives, who felt Wallace was too radical and "eccentric" in his private life to be an effective running mate (he practiced New Age spiritual beliefs, and often consulted with the controversial Russian spiritual guru Nicholas Roerich). But Roosevelt insisted that without Wallace on the ticket he would decline re-nomination, and when First Lady Eleanor Roosevelt came to Chicago to vouch for Wallace, he won the vice-presidential nomination with 626 votes to 329 for House Speaker William B. Bankhead of Alabama.

Republican Party

In the months leading up to the opening of the 1940 Republican National Convention in Philadelphia, Pennsylvania, the Republican Party was deeply divided between the party's isolationists, who wanted to stay out of World War II at all costs, and the party's interventionists, who felt that the United Kingdom needed to be given all aid short of war to prevent Nazi Germany from conquering all of Europe. The three leading candidates for the Republican nomination - Senator Robert A. Taft from Ohio, Senator Arthur H. Vandenberg from Michigan, and District Attorney Thomas E. Dewey from New York - were all isolationists to varying degrees.

Taft was the leader of the conservative, isolationist wing of the Republican Party, and his main strength was in his native Midwestern United States and parts of the Southern United States. Dewey, the District Attorney for Manhattan, had risen to national fame as the "Gangbuster" prosecutor who had sent numerous infamous Mafia figures to prison, most notably Lucky Luciano, the organized-crime boss of New York City. Dewey had won most of the presidential primaries in the spring of 1940, and he came into the Republican Convention in June with the largest number of delegate votes, although he was still well below the number needed to win. Vandenberg, the senior Republican in the Senate, was the "favorite son" candidate of the Michigan delegation and was considered a possible compromise candidate if Taft or Dewey faltered. Former President Herbert Hoover was also spoken of as a compromise candidate.

However, each of these candidates had weaknesses that could be exploited. Taft's outspoken isolationism and opposition to any American involvement in the European war convinced many Republican leaders that he could not win a general election, particularly as France fell to the Nazis in June 1940 and Germany threatened the United Kingdom. Dewey's relative youth—he was only 38 in 1940—and lack of any foreign-policy experience caused his candidacy to weaken as the Wehrmacht emerged as a fearsome threat. In 1940, Vandenberg was also an isolationist (he would change his foreign-policy stance during World War II) and his lackadaisical, lethargic campaign never caught the voters' attention. Hoover still bore the stigma of having presided over the Wall Street Crash of 1929 and the subsequent Great Depression. This left an opening for a dark horse candidate to emerge.

A Wall Street-based industrialist named Wendell Willkie, who had never before run for public office, emerged as the unlikely nominee. Willkie, a native of Indiana and a former Democrat who had supported Franklin Roosevelt in the 1932 United States presidential election, was considered an improbable choice. Willkie had first come to public attention as an articulate critic of Roosevelt's attempt to break up electrical power monopolies.

Willkie was the CEO of the Commonwealth & Southern Corporation, which provided electrical power to customers in eleven states. In 1933, President Roosevelt had created the Tennessee Valley Authority (TVA), which promised to provide flood control and cheap electricity to the impoverished people of the Tennessee Valley. However, the government-run TVA would compete with Willkie's Commonwealth & Southern, and this led Willkie to criticize and oppose the TVA's attempt to compete with private power companies. Willkie argued that the government had unfair advantages over private corporations, and should thus avoid competing directly against them.

However, Willkie did not dismiss all of Roosevelt's social welfare programs, indeed supporting those he believed could not be managed any better by the free enterprise system. Furthermore, unlike the leading Republican candidates, Willkie was a forceful and outspoken advocate of aid to the Allies of World War II, especially the United Kingdom. His support of giving all aid to the British "short of declaring war" won him the support of many Republicans on the East Coast of the United States, who disagreed with their party's isolationist leaders in Congress.

Willkie's persuasive arguments impressed these Republicans, who believed that he would be an attractive presidential candidate. Many of the leading press barons of the era, such as Ogden Reid of the New York Herald Tribune, Roy Howard of the Scripps-Howard newspaper chain and John and Gardner Cowles Jr. publishers of the Minneapolis Star and the Minneapolis Tribune, as well as The Des Moines Register and Look magazine, supported Willkie in their newspapers and magazines. Even so, Willkie remained a long-shot candidate; the May 8 Gallup Poll showed Dewey at 67% support among Republicans, followed by Vandenberg and Taft, with Willkie at only 3%.

The German Army's rapid Blitzkrieg campaign into France in May 1940 shook American public opinion, even as Taft was telling a Kansas audience that America needed to concentrate on domestic issues to prevent Roosevelt from using the war crisis to extend socialism at home. Both Dewey and Vandenberg also continued to oppose any aid to the United Kingdom that might lead to war with Nazi Germany. Nevertheless, sympathy for the embattled British was mounting daily, and this aided Willkie's candidacy. By mid-June, little over one week before the Republican Convention opened, the Gallup poll reported that Willkie had moved into second place with 17%, and that Dewey was slipping. Fueled by his favorable media attention, Willkie's pro-British statements won over many of the delegates. As the delegates were arriving in Philadelphia, Gallup reported that Willkie had surged to 29%, Dewey had slipped five more points to 47%, and Taft, Vandenberg and Hoover trailed at 8%, 8%, and 6% respectively.

Hundreds of thousands, perhaps as many as one million, telegrams urging support for Willkie poured in, many from "Willkie Clubs" that had sprung up across the country. Millions more signed petitions circulating everywhere. At the 1940 Republican National Convention itself, keynote speaker Harold Stassen, the Governor of Minnesota, announced his support for Willkie and became his official floor manager. Hundreds of vocal Willkie supporters packed the upper galleries of the convention hall. Willkie's amateur status and fresh face appealed to delegates as well as voters. Most of the delegations were selected not by primaries, but by party leaders in each state, and they had a keen sense of the fast-changing pulse of public opinion. Gallup found the same thing in polling data not reported until after the convention: Willkie had moved ahead among Republican voters by 44% to only 29% for the collapsing Dewey. As the pro-Willkie galleries chanted "We Want Willkie!" the delegates on the convention floor began their vote. Dewey led on the first ballot, but steadily lost strength thereafter. Both Taft and Willkie gained in strength on each ballot, and by the fourth ballot it was obvious that either Willkie or Taft would be the nominee. The key moments came when the delegations of large states such as Michigan, Pennsylvania, and New York left Dewey and Vandenberg and switched to Willkie, giving him the victory on the sixth ballot.

Willkie's nomination was one of the most dramatic moments in any political convention. Having given little thought to whom he would select as his vice-presidential nominee, Willkie left the decision to convention chairman and Massachusetts Representative Joseph Martin, the House Minority Leader, who suggested Senate Minority Leader Charles L. McNary from Oregon. Despite the fact that McNary had spearheaded a "Stop Willkie" campaign late in the balloting, the convention picked him to be Willkie's running mate.

General election

Polling

The Gallup Poll accurately predicted the election outcome. However, the American Institute of Public Opinion, responsible for the Gallup Poll, avoided predicting the outcome, citing a four percent margin of error. The Gallup Poll also found that, if there was no war in Europe, voters preferred Willkie over Roosevelt.

Fall campaign

Willkie crusaded against Roosevelt's attempt to break the two-term presidential tradition, arguing that "if one man is indispensable, then none of us is free." Even some Democrats who had supported Roosevelt in the past disapproved of his attempt to win a third term, and Willkie hoped to win their votes. Willkie also criticized what he claimed was the incompetence and waste in Roosevelt's New Deal welfare programs. He stated that as president he would keep most of Roosevelt's government programs, but would make them more efficient.

However, many Americans still blamed business leaders for the Great Depression, and the fact that Willkie symbolized "Big Business" hurt him with many working-class voters. Willkie was a fearless campaigner; he often visited industrial areas where Republicans were still blamed for causing the Great Depression and where Roosevelt was highly popular. In these areas, Willkie frequently had rotten fruit and vegetables thrown at him and was heckled by crowds; still, he was unfazed.

Willkie also accused Roosevelt of leaving the nation unprepared for war, but Roosevelt's military buildup and transformation of the nation into the "Arsenal of Democracy" removed the "unpreparedness" charge as a major issue. Willkie then reversed his approach and charged Roosevelt with secretly planning to take the nation into World War II. This accusation did cut into Roosevelt's support. In response, Roosevelt, in a pledge that he would later regret, promised that he would "not send American boys into any foreign wars."  The United Kingdom actively intervened throughout the election against isolationism.

Results
Roosevelt led in all pre-election opinion polls by various margins. On Election Day—November 5, 1940, he received 27.3 million votes to Willkie's 22.3 million, and in the Electoral College, he defeated Willkie by a margin of 449 to 82. Willkie did get over six million more votes than the Republican nominee in 1936, Alf Landon, and he ran strong in rural areas in the American Midwest, taking over 57% of the farm vote. Many counties in the Midwest have not voted for a Democrat since. Roosevelt, meanwhile, carried every American city with a population of more than 400,000 except Cincinnati, Ohio. Of the 106 cities with more than 100,000 population, he won 61% of the votes cast; in the Southern United States as a whole, he won 73% of the total vote. In the remainder of the country (the rural and small-town Northern United States), Willkie had a majority of 53%. In the cities, there was a class differential, with the white-collar and middle-class voters supporting the Republican candidate, and working class, blue-collar voters going for FDR. In the North, Roosevelt won 87% of the Jewish vote, 73% of the Catholics, and 61% of the nonmembers, while all the major Protestant denominations showed majorities for Willkie.

Roosevelt's net vote totals in the twelve largest cities decreased from 3,479,000 votes in the 1936 election to 2,112,000 votes, but it was still higher than his result from the 1932 election when he won by 1,791,000 votes. Of the 3,094 counties/independent cities, Roosevelt won in 1,947 (62.93%) while Willkie carried 1,147 (37.07%).

Records
Roosevelt was the third of just four presidents in United States history to win re-election with a lower percentage of the electoral vote than in their prior elections, the other three were James Madison in 1812, Woodrow Wilson in 1916 and Barack Obama in 2012. Additionally, Roosevelt was the fourth of only five presidents to win re-election with a smaller percentage of the popular vote than in prior elections, the other four are James Madison in 1812, Andrew Jackson in 1832, Grover Cleveland in 1892, and Obama in 2012. This marked the first time since 1892, that the Democrats won the popular vote in three consecutive elections, and the first since 1840, where they won three consecutive elections. Although at a rate lower than 1936, Roosevelt maintained his strong majorities from labor unions, big city political machines, ethnic minority voters, and the traditionally Democratic Solid South. Roosevelt's third consecutive victory inspired the Twenty-second Amendment, limiting the number of terms a person may be president.

This was the first time that North Dakota voted for a losing candidate and the first time since 1892 that a Democrat won without Colorado, Kansas, and Nebraska. This was also the first time anyone won without Colorado and Nebraska since 1908, and Kansas since 1900.

Willkie and McNary both died in 1944 (October 8, and February 25, respectively); the first, and to date only time both members of a major-party presidential ticket died during the term for which they sought election. Had they been elected, Willkie's death would have resulted in the Secretary of State becoming acting president for the remainder of the term ending on January 20, 1945, in accordance with the Presidential Succession Act of 1886.

Source (Popular Vote): Source (Electoral Vote):

Geography of results

Cartographic gallery

Results by state

Close states
Margin of victory less than 1% (19 electoral votes):
 Michigan, 0.33% (6,926 votes)

Margin of victory less than 5% (192 electoral votes):
 Indiana, 1.42% (25,403 votes)
 Wisconsin, 1.82% (25,615 votes)
 Maine, 2.33% (7,473 votes)
 Illinois, 2.43% (102,694 votes)
 Colorado, 2.55% (14,022 votes)
 New York, 3.56% (224,440 votes)
 New Jersey, 3.62% (71,528 votes)
 Minnesota, 3.83% (47,922 votes)
 Iowa, 4.41% (53,570 votes)
 Ohio, 4.41% (146,366 votes)
 Missouri, 4.77% (87,467 votes)

Margin of victory between 5% and 10% (83 electoral votes):
 Wyoming, 5.93% (6,654 votes)
 New Hampshire, 6.44% (15,165 votes)
 Massachusetts, 6.75% (136,822 votes)
 Pennsylvania, 6.89% (281,187 votes) (tipping point state)
 Connecticut, 7.14% (55,802 votes)
 Oregon, 8.07% (38,860 votes)
 Idaho, 9.05% (21,289 votes)
 Delaware, 9.65% (13,159 votes)
 Vermont, 9.86% (14,102 votes)

Statistics

Counties with Highest Percent of Vote (Democratic)
 Terrell County, Georgia 100.00%
 Tate County, Mississippi 99.81%
 Lancaster County, South Carolina 99.57%
 Calhoun County, South Carolina 99.55%
 Chesterfield County, South Carolina 99.31%

Counties with Highest Percent of Vote (Republican)
 McIntosh County, North Dakota 91.66%
 Jackson County, Kentucky 88.62%
 Gillespie County, Texas 86.74%
 Mercer County, North Dakota 85.36%
 Johnson County, Tennessee 84.21%

Foreign interference
The British government engaged covert intelligence operations to support Roosevelt, including the planting of false news stories, wiretaps, "October surprises", and other intelligence activities.

See also
 1940 United States House of Representatives elections
 1940 United States Senate elections
 History of the United States (1918–1945)
 Third inauguration of Franklin D. Roosevelt
 The Plot Against America, a 2004 alternative history by Philip Roth, premised on the 1940 defeat of Roosevelt by Charles Lindbergh
 Bring the Jubilee, a 1953 alternative history novel by Ward Moore, set in a universe where the Confederacy won the American Civil War, where the election is contested by Whig candidate Thomas E. Dewey and Populist candidate Jennings Lewis.

References

Further reading
 Barnard, Ellsworth .  Wendell Willkie: Fighter for Freedom (1966)
 Bowen, Michael D. The Roots of Modern Conservatism: Dewey, Taft, and the Battle for the Soul of the Republican Party (U of North Carolina Press, 2011).
 Burns, James MacGregor.  Roosevelt: The Lion and the Fox (1956)
 Cole, Wayne S. America First: The Battle against Intervention, 1940–41 (1953)
 Cole, Wayne S. Charles A. Lindbergh and the Battle against American Intervention in World War II (1974)
 Davies, Gareth, and Julian E. Zelizer, eds. America at the Ballot Box: Elections and Political History (2015) pp. 153–66.
 DeSilvio, David. How Domestic Politics Influenced Foreign Policy in the 1940 Election: FDR, Domestic Politics, Foreign Policy, and the Election of 1940 (2008)
 Divine, Robert A. Foreign policy and U.S. presidential elections, 1940-1948 (1974) online; pp 3–90 on 1940 
 Doenecke, Justus D. Storm on the Horizon: The Challenge to American Intervention, 1939–1941 (2000).
 Doenecke, Justus D. The Battle Against Intervention, 1939–1941 (1997), includes short narrative and primary documents.
 Donahoe, Bernard F. Private Plans and Public Dangers: The Story of FDR's Third Nomination (University of Notre Dame Press, 1965). 
 Dunn, Susan. 1940: FDR, Willkie, Lindbergh, Hitler-the Election Amid the Storm (Yale UP, 2013). excerpt
 Evjen, Henry O. "The Willkie Campaign; An Unfortunate Chapter in Republican Leadership", Journal of Politics (1952) 14#2 pp. 241–56 in JSTOR
 Gamm, Gerald H. The making of the New Deal Democrats: Voting behavior and realignment in Boston, 1920-1940 (U of Chicago Press, 1989).
 Gleason, S. Everett and William L. Langer. The Undeclared War, 1940–1941 1953 Policy toward war in Europe; pro FDR
 Grant, Philip A., Jr. "The Presidential Election of 1940 in Missouri." Missouri Historical Review 1988 83(1) pp 1–16.   Abstract: Missouri serves as a good barometer of nationwide political sentiment; The two major political parties considered Missouri a key state in the 1940 presidential election. Wendell Willkie captured 64 of the state's 114 counties, but huge majorities in the urban counties carried the state for Franklin D. Roosevelt.
 Jeffries, John W. A Third Term for FDR: The Election of 1940 (University Press of Kansas, 2017). xiv, 264 pp. excerpt
 Jensen, Richard. "The cities reelect Roosevelt: Ethnicity, religion, and class in 1940." Ethnicity. An Interdisciplinary Journal of the Study of Ethnic Relations  (1981) 8#2 pp 189–195.

 Johnstone, Andrew , and Andrew Priest, eds.  US Presidential Elections and Foreign Policy: Candidates, Campaigns, and Global Politics from FDR to Bill Clinton (2017) pp 19-39. online

 Jonas, Manfred. Isolationism in America, 1935–1941 (1966).
 Katz, Daniel. "The public opinion polls and the 1940 election." Public Opinion Quarterly 5.1 (1941) 52–78.
 Lewis, David Levering. The Improbable Wendell Willkie: The Businessman Who Saved the Republican Party and His Country, and Conceived a New World Order (Liveright, 2018). excerpt
 Luconi, Stefano. "Machine Politics and the Consolidation of the Roosevelt Majority: The Case of Italian Americans in Pittsburgh and Philadelphia." Journal of American Ethnic History (1996) 32–59. in JSTOR
 Madison, James H., ed. Wendell Willkie: Hoosier Internationalist (Indiana University Press, 1992) essays by experts.
 Moe, Richard. Roosevelt's Second Act: The Election of 1940 and the Politics of War (Oxford UP, 2013). excerpt
 Neal, Steve. Dark Horse: A Biography of Wendell Willkie (1989)
 Overacker, Louise. "Campaign finance in the Presidential Election of 1940." American Political Science Review 35.4 (1941): 701–727. in JSTOR
 Parmet, Herbert S., and Marie B. Hecht. Never again: A president runs for a third term (1968).
 Peters, Charles. Five Days in Philadelphia: 1940, Wendell Willkie, FDR and the Political Convention That Won World War II (2006).

 Robinson, Edgar Eugene. They Voted for Roosevelt: The Presidential Vote 1932-1944 (1947). Election returns by County for every state.
 Ross, Hugh. "John L. Lewis and the Election of 1940." Labor History 1976 17(2)  160–189. Abstract: The breach between John L. Lewis and Franklin D. Roosevelt in 1940 stemmed from domestic and foreign policy concerns. The struggle to organize the steel industry, and after 1938, business attempts to erode Walsh-Healy and the Fair Labor Standards Act provided the backdrop for the feud. But activities of Nazi agents, working through William Rhodes Davis, increased Lewis' suspicions of Roosevelt's interventionist foreign policy and were important in the decision to support Wendell Willkie.
 Savage, Sean J. "The 1936-1944 Campaigns," in William D. Pederson, ed. A Companion to Franklin D. Roosevelt (2011) pp 96–113
 Schneider, James C. Should America Go to War? The Debate over Foreign Policy in Chicago, 1939–1941 (1989)
 Schearer, Michael. "The Emergence of Wendell Willkie as the 1940 Republican Nominee." (SSRN 2019) online.

Primary sources 
 Cantril, Hadley and Mildred Strunk, eds.; Public Opinion, 1935–1946 (1951), massive compilation of many public opinion polls from USA online
 Doenecke, Justus D. ed. In Danger Undaunted: The Anti-Interventionist Movement of 1940–1941 as Revealed in the Papers of the America First Committee (1990) excerpt
 Gallup, George H. ed. The Gallup Poll, Volume One 1935–1948 (1972) statistical reports on each poll
 Chester, Edward W  A guide to political platforms (1977) online
 Porter, Kirk H. and Donald Bruce Johnson, eds. National party platforms, 1840-1964 (1965) online 1840-1956

External links
 
 1940 popular vote by counties
 Election of 1940 in Counting the Votes

 
Presidency of Franklin D. Roosevelt
Franklin D. Roosevelt
November 1940 events